Isère is a landlocked department in the southeastern French region of Auvergne-Rhône-Alpes. Named after the river Isère, it had a population of 1,271,166 in 2019. Its prefecture is Grenoble. It borders Rhône to the northwest, Ain to the north, Savoie to the east, Hautes-Alpes to the south, Drôme and Ardèche to the southwest and Loire to the west.

History 

Isère is one of the original 83 departments created during the French Revolution on 4 March 1790. It was established from the main part of the former province of Dauphiné. Its area was reduced twice, in 1852 and again in 1967, on both occasions losing territory to the department of Rhône.

In 1852 in response to rapid urban development around the edge of Lyon, the (hitherto Isère) communes of Bron, Vaulx-en-Velin, Vénissieux and Villeurbanne were transferred to Rhône. In 1967 the redrawing of local government borders led to the creation of the Urban Community of Lyon (more recently known simply as Greater Lyon or Grand Lyon). At that time intercommunal groupings of this nature were not permitted to straddle departmental frontiers, and accordingly 23 more Isère communes (along with six communes from Ain) found themselves transferred to Rhône. The affected Isère communes were Chaponnay, Chassieu, Communay, Corbas, Décines-Charpieu, Feyzin, Genas, Jonage, Jons, Marennes, Meyzieu, Mions, Pusignan, Saint-Bonnet-de-Mure, Saint-Laurent-de-Mure, Saint-Pierre-de-Chandieu, Saint-Priest, Saint-Symphorien-d'Ozon, Sérézin-du-Rhône, Simandres, Solaize, Ternay and Toussieu.

Most recently, on 1 April 1971, Colombier-Saugnieu was transferred to Rhône. Banners appeared in the commune's three little villages at the time proclaiming Dauphinois toujours ("Always Dauphinois").

Isère was also the name of the French ship which delivered the 214 boxes containing the components of the Statue of Liberty.

Geography 

Isère includes a part of the French Alps. The Vercors Plateau aesthetically dominates the western part of the department.

Principal towns

The most populous commune is Grenoble, the prefecture. As of 2019, there are 7 communes with more than 20,000 inhabitants:

Demographics 
Inhabitants of the department are called Isérois (masculine) and Iséroises (feminine).

Population development since 1801:

Politics

Departmental politics 
The President of the Departmental Council has been Jean-Pierre Barbier of The Republicans (LR) since 2015.

Following the 2021 departmental election, the Departmental Council of Isère (58 seats) was composed as follows:

Representation in Paris

National Assembly 
In the 2017 legislative election, Isère elected the following representatives to the National Assembly:

Senate 
In the 2017 Senate election, Isère elected Didier Rambaud (La République En Marche!), Guillaume Gontard (miscellaneous left), Frédérique Puissat (The Republicans), Michel Savin (The Republicans) and André Vallini (Socialist Party) for the 2017–2023 term.

Culture 

The Grande Chartreuse is the mother abbey of the Carthusian order.

As early as the 13th century, residents of the north and central parts of Isère spoke a dialect of the Franco-Provençal language called Dauphinois, while those in the Southern parts spoke the Vivaro-Alpine dialect of Occitan. Both continued to be spoken in rural areas of Isère into the 20th century.

Tourism 
Isère features many ski resorts, including the Alpe d'Huez, Les Deux Alpes, the 1968 Winter Olympics resorts of Chamrousse, Villard de Lans, Autrans. Other popular resorts include Les 7 Laux, Méaudre, Saint-Pierre-de-Chartreuse, Alpe du Grand Serre and Gresse-en-Vercors. At the department level, Isère is the third-largest ski and winter destination in France, after Savoie and Haute-Savoie. It also hosts Coupe Icare, an annual festival of free flight, such as paragliding and hang-gliding, held at the world-renowned paragliding site at Lumbin.

Grenoble has a dozen museums, including its most famous, established in 1798, the Museum of Grenoble. The European Synchrotron Radiation Facility (ESRF), an international research facility in Grenoble, is also open to visitors.

See also 
 Cantons of the Isère department
 Communes of the Isère department
 Arrondissements of the Isère department

References

External links 

 Prefecture website 
 Departmental Council website 

 
1790 establishments in France
Departments of Auvergne-Rhône-Alpes
Auvergne-Rhône-Alpes region articles needing translation from French Wikipedia
States and territories established in 1790